Strawberry is an unincorporated community and census-designated place (CDP) in Gila County, Arizona, United States. The population was 961 at the 2010 census.

History
In June 1931, the Bureau of Prohibition destroyed a large whiskey still in Sandrock Canyon, north of Strawberry. The still had an estimated worth of $20,000. Seven hundred gallons of "mountain whiskey" were destroyed and three men arrested.

Geography
Strawberry is located in the northwest corner of Gila County at  (34.4078063, -111.4934754). It is bordered to the south and east by Pine, and to the north by Coconino County. The county line follows the edge of the Mogollon Rim.

Arizona State Route 87 passes through Strawberry. It is a two-hour drive——northeast from Phoenix.

The community is in the valley of Strawberry Creek, part of the Verde River watershed.

Demographics

As of the census of 2000, there were 1,028 people, 491 households, and 354 families residing in the CDP. The racial makeup of the CDP was 96.7% White, 0.1% Black or African American, 0.6% Native American, 0.7% Asian, 1.0% from other races, and 1.0% from two or more races. Hispanic or Latino of any race were 3.1% of the population.

There were 491 households, out of which 14.9% had children under the age of 18 living with them, 64.6% were married couples living together, 4.9% had a female householder with no husband present, and 27.7% were non-families. 24.4% of all households were made up of individuals, and 11.6% had someone living alone who was 65 years of age or older.  The average household size was 2.09 and the average family size was 2.44.

In the CDP, the population was spread out, with 13.4% under the age of 18, 2.9% from 18 to 24, 17.1% from 25 to 44, 40.6% from 45 to 64, and 26.0% who were 65 years of age or older.  The median age was 54 years. For every 100 females, there were 96.6 males.  For every 100 females age 18 and over, there were 95.2 males.

The median income for a household in the CDP was $35,739, and the median income for a family was $42,279. Males had a median income of $38,125 versus $26,389 for females. The per capita income for the CDP was $21,609.  About 6.9% of families and 10.8% of the population were below the poverty line, including 25.2% of those under age 18 and 1.5% of those age 65 or over.

See also
 List of historic properties in Pine-Strawberry, Arizona
 Fossil Creek

References

External links

 Strawberry Schoolhouse
 Strawberry Walking History Trail
 Rim Country Chamber of Commerce

Populated places of the Mogollon Rim
Census-designated places in Gila County, Arizona